Mukhdabbi is a village in the Khyber Pakhtunkhwa province of Pakistan. It is located at 34°9'0N 73°7'0E with an altitude of 1137 metres (3733 feet). Neighbouring settlements include Jalalia, Gup and Bain Gojri.

References

Villages in Khyber Pakhtunkhwa